Joss may refer to:

 Joss (name), including a list of people with the name
 JOSS, a time-sharing programming language
 Joss (Chinese statue), a religious object
 Joss JP1, an Australian-built supercar
 Joss paper, a type of burnt offering
 Joss Pass, a mountain pass in British Columbia, Canada
 Joss stick, a form of incense
 Abbreviation for the Journal of Open Source Software
Joss., taxonomic author abbreviation of Marcel Josserand (1900–1992), a French mycologist

See also
Joe (disambiguation)
Jos (disambiguation)
Joseph (disambiguation)